The 551st United States Air Force Hospital was a hospital at Otis Air Force Base. With the closure of the base in 1973, the hospital closed. It was the site of the birth of Patrick Bouvier Kennedy. The hospital consisted of a series of connected one-story buildings. The buildings were torn down in the early 1970s.

See also
 List of military installations in Massachusetts

References

External links
 Information on a MARS radio station in the hospital
 Link to Brigadier General Hamilton B. Webb
 Information on room upgrade

Hospitals in Barnstable County, Massachusetts
Bourne, Massachusetts
Installations of the United States Air Force in Massachusetts
Military hospitals in the United States
Medical installations of the United States Air Force
Defunct hospitals in Massachusetts
1973 disestablishments in Massachusetts